4F or 4-F may refer to:
 4F (company), a Polish sportswear company
 4-F classification in the U.S. Selective Service System, identifying a person as unfit for military service
 4F correlator, in Fourier optics
 The 4f electron shell
 Section 4(f) of the United States DOT act of 1966, which regulates acquiring park and historic properties for transportation use.
 4F case, a 4 February 2006 controversial criminal case in Barcelona
 Flottille 4F a French naval aviation squadron
 LMS Fowler Class 4F, a class of 0-6-0 steam locomotive
 February 1992 Venezuelan coup d'état attempt, known in Venezuela as "4F".

See also
F4 (disambiguation)
Four Fs (disambiguation)